The Delaware State House of Representatives is the lower house of the Delaware General Assembly, the state legislature of the U.S. state of Delaware. It is composed of 41 Representatives from an equal number of constituencies, each of whom is elected to a two-year term. Its members are not subject to term limits, and their terms start the day after the election. The House meets at the Delaware Legislative Hall in Dover.

Name
From 1776 to 1792, the chamber was known as the House of Assembly, a common name for lower houses of colonial legislatures and states under the Confederation. The name was changed by Delaware's 1792 Constitution, reflecting the new federal House of Representatives. This change on the part of Delaware initiated a movement that has resulted in a majority of the lower houses of U.S. state legislatures sharing the name of the federal House of Representatives.

Leadership
The Speaker of the House presides over the House of Representatives. The Speaker is elected by the majority party caucus followed by confirmation of the full House through the passage of a House Resolution. The Speaker is the chief leadership position of the body. The other House leaders are elected by their respective party caucuses. The Majority Leader determines which bills are brought to the floor for debate from an Agenda prepared by the Speaker of the House and manages debates and floor votes.

Terry Spence (R) was the longest serving speaker in the history of the Delaware General Assembly.

Qualifications
Members of the House of Representatives must be citizens of the United States, have lived in Delaware for three years, been a resident of their constituent district for at least one year preceding their election, and must be at least 24 years old by the time of their election.

Current composition

Current members

Past composition of the House of Representatives

See also
Delaware Senate

References

External links
Delaware House of Representatives

 
General Assembly House
State lower houses in the United States